Edward Russell Hicks (June 4, 1895 – June 1, 1957) was an American film character actor. Hicks was born in 1895 in Baltimore, Maryland. During World War I, he served in the U.S. Army in France. He later became a lieutenant Colonel in the California State Guard.

Hicks was a character actor appearing in bit parts and small supporting roles in nearly 300 films between 1933 and 1956. He often appeared as a smooth-talking confidence man, or swindler as in the W.C. Fields film The Bank Dick (1940). Hicks played a variety of judges, corrupt officials, crooked businessmen and attorneys, working in a variety of mediums almost until his death. Hicks appeared once in the syndicated western television series The Cisco Kid.

Broadway plays in which Hicks acted included The Caine Mutiny Court-Martial (1954), On Borrowed Time (1953), Time for Elizabeth (1948), All the King's Horses (1934), The Little Black Book (1932), Nona (1932), Torch Song (1930), Goin' Home (1928), No Trespassing (1926), and The Wisecrackers (1925).

On June 1, 1957, Hicks suffered a heart attack after an automobile accident and was dead on arrival at Santa Monica Receiving Hospital. He was 61.

Filmography

 The Birth of a Nation (1915) as Minor Role (film debut) (uncredited)
 Intolerance (1916) as Extra (uncredited)
 Before Morning (1933) as James Nichols
 Enlighten Thy Daughter (1934) as Daniel Stevens
 The Case of the Howling Dog (1934) as Clinton Foley
 Happiness Ahead (1934) as Jim Meehan
 The St. Louis Kid (1934) as Gorman (uncredited)
 The Firebird (1934) as Mr. Beyer – the Stage Manager
 Gentlemen Are Born (1934) as Newspaper Editor
 Babbitt (1934) as Commissioner Lyle Gurnee
 Murder in the Clouds (1934) as Taggart
 The Secret Bride (1934) as John F. Holdstock
 Devil Dogs of the Air (1935) as Captain
 The Woman in Red (1935) as Clayton – Defense Attorney
 Sweet Music (1935) as The Mayor
 Living on Velvet (1935) as Major
 While the Patient Slept (1935) as Dr. Jay
 Cardinal Richelieu (1935) as Le Moyne
 Go Into Your Dance (1935) as Sam Rupert (uncredited)
 $10 Raise (1935) as Hendricks (uncredited)
 Ladies Crave Excitement (1935) as Bert Taylor
 Honeymoon Limited (1935) as Slug Gorman / Sugar Carver
 Lady Tubbs (1935) as Mr. Ronald Ash-Orcutt
 Dante's Inferno (1935) as Prosecuting Attorney (uncredited)
 Ladies Love Danger (1935) as Melvin
 Thunder in the Night (1935) as Prefect of Police
 Charlie Chan in Shanghai (1935) as James Andrews
 1,000 Dollars a Minute (1935) as Sonny Rycross
 Grand Exit (1935) as Drake (uncredited)
 Millions in the Air (1935) as Davis
 If You Could Only Cook (1935) as Dillon (uncredited)
 Two in the Dark (1936) as McCord – Police Officer (uncredited)
 Tough Guy (1936) as Corbin (uncredited)
 Rose Marie (1936) as Commandant (uncredited)
 Follow the Fleet (1936) as Jim Nolan
 The Music Goes 'Round (1936) as Mr. Cohn (uncredited)
 Laughing Irish Eyes (1936) as Silk Taylor
 Woman Trap (1936) as Dodd
 Special Investigator (1936) as Insp. Perkett
 Fatal Lady (1936) as American Opera House Manager (uncredited)
 Hearts in Bondage (1936) as Sen. Pillsbury
 Trapped by Television (1936) as J.F. Howland – Board Member (uncredited)
 Ticket to Paradise (1936) as Colton
 Bunker Bean (1936) as A.C. Jones
 Spendthrift (1936) as Attorney (uncredited)
 Grand Jury (1936) as Jim Hanify
 Straight from the Shoulder (1936) as Capt. Daniels (uncredited)
 The General Died at Dawn (1936) as American with No Matches (uncredited)
 Sea Spoilers (1936) as Phil Morgan
 15 Maiden Lane (1936) as Judge Graham
 The Accusing Finger (1936) as Senator Forrest
 Laughing at Trouble (1936) as Cyrus Hall
 Dodge City Trail (1936) as Kenyon Phillips
 We Who Are About to Die (1937) as District Attorney Knight (uncredited)
 Secret Valley (1937) as Austin Martin
 Girl Overboard (1937) as Sam Le Maire
 Espionage (1937) as Alfred Hartrix (uncredited)
 23 1/2 Hours' Leave (1937) as Capt. Barker
 Maytime (1937) as Monsieur Bulliet (uncredited)
 Midnight Taxi (1937) as Barney Flagg
 King of Gamblers (1937) as Man at Temple's Table (uncredited)
 Maytime (1937) as Monsieur Bulliet (uncredited)
 Let Them Live (1937) as Newspaper Editor (uncredited)
 Criminals of the Air (1937) as Kurt Feldon
 It Happened Out West (1937) as Cooley
 Pick a Star (1937) as Mr. Stone
 Fifty Roads to Town (1937) as Police Official
 The Wildcatter (1937) as Tom Frayne
 On Again-Off Again (1937) as George Dilwig
 A Dangerous Adventure (1937) as Allen
 The Toast of New York (1937) as Lawyer
 The Big Shot (1937) as Martin Drake
 The Man Who Cried Wolf (1937) as Prosecuting Attorney (uncredited)
 Fit for a King (1937) as Editor Hardwick
 Partners in Crime (1937) as Mayor Callahan
 The Westland Case (1937) as Mr. Woodbury
 Clipped Wings (1937) as Capt. Morton
 Wise Girl (1937) as David Larrimore (uncredited)
 In Old Chicago (1938) as Politician in Jack's Office
 The Big Broadcast of 1938 (1938) as Capt. Stafford
 Kidnapped (1938) as Bailiff
 Men with Wings (1938) as Gen. Marlin (uncredited)
 Little Miss Broadway (1938) as Perry
 Gateway (1938) as Ernest Porter
 You Can't Take It with You (1938) as Attorney to Kirby (uncredited)
 Fugitives for a Night (1938) as Maurice Tenwright
 That Certain Age (1938) as Scout Leader (uncredited)
 Kentucky (1938) as Thad Goodwin Sr. – 1861
 North of Shanghai (1939) as Rowley
 Boy Trouble (1939) as Magistrate
 Boy Slaves (1939) as Albee's Attorney (uncredited)
 Honolulu (1939) as Mr. Clifford Jones (uncredited)
 The Three Musketeers (1939) as Porthos
 I Was a Convict (1939) as District Attorney
 The Story of Vernon and Irene Castle (1939) as Colonel (uncredited)
 The Story of Alexander Graham Bell (1939) as Mr. Barrows
 East Side of Heaven (1939) as Hinkle (uncredited)
 Hotel Imperial (1939) as Austrian Officer (uncredited)
 Union Pacific (1939) as Sergeant (uncredited)
 Man of Conquest (1939) as Mr. Allen (uncredited)
 Hotel for Women (1939) as Van Ellis (uncredited)
 Stanley and Livingstone (1939) as Commissioner
 Our Leading Citizen (1939) as Chairman (uncredited)
 The Real Glory (1939) as Capt. George Manning
 Rio (1939) as Banker (uncredited)
 Hollywood Cavalcade (1939) as Roberts
 Bad Little Angel (1939) as Maj. Ellwood – Newspaper Owner (uncredited)
 Rulers of the Sea (1939) as Mr. Cunard (uncredited)
 Joe and Ethel Turp Call on the President (1939) as Mr. Graves
 The Honeymoon's Over (1939) as J.P. Walker
 The Big Guy (1939) as Lawson
 Swanee River (1939) as Andrew McDowell
 The Blue Bird (1940) as Daddy Tyl
 Parole Fixer (1940) as U.S. District Court Judge
 Johnny Apollo (1940) as District Attorney
 Virginia City (1940) as John Armistead
 Enemy Agent (1940) as Lyman Scott
 Earthbound (1940) as Prosecutor
 The Mortal Storm (1940) as Rector
 Queen of the Mob (1940) as Judge (uncredited)
 Sporting Blood (1940) as 'Sneak' OBrien
 The Return of Frank James (1940) as Prosecutor
 Junior G-Men (1940, Serial) as Col. Barton
 Fugitive from a Prison Camp (1940) as Minor Role (uncredited)
 Nobody's Children (1940) as Sen. Lawrence Hargrave (uncredited)
 Seven Sinners (1940) as First Governor
 East of the River (1940) as Warden
 The Bank Dick (1940) as J. Frothingham Waterbury
 Lady with Red Hair (1940) Wealthy London Host (uncredited)
 A Night at Earl Carroll's (1940) as Mayor Jones of Hollywood
 No, No, Nanette (1940) as 'Hutch' Hutchinson
 Santa Fe Trail (1940) as Dr. J. Boyce Russell (uncredited)
 Love Thy Neighbor (1940) as Mr. Harrington
 Arkansas Judge (1941) as John Root – Attorney
 Western Union (1941) as Governor
 The Strawberry Blonde (1941) as Treadway – Hugo's Lawyer (uncredited)
 A Man Betrayed (1941) as C.R. Pringle
 Ellery Queen's Penthouse Mystery (1941) as Walsh
 Here Comes Happiness (1941) as John Vance
 The Man Who Lost Himself (1941) as Mr. Van der Girt
 Man Made Monster (1941) as Prison Warden Harris (uncredited)
 The Great Lie (1941) as Col. Harriston
 Blood and Sand (1941) as Marquis
 The Big Store (1941) as Arthur Hastings
 Sergeant York (1941) as General (uncredited)
 The Parson of Panamint (1941) as Prosecuting Attorney
 Hold That Ghost (1941) as Bannister
 Dive Bomber (1941) as Admiral – Speaks at Final Awards (uncredited)
 The Little Foxes (1941) as William Marshall
 The Pittsburgh Kid (1941) (uncredited)
 Doctors Don't Tell (1941) as Supt. Duff
 Unexpected Uncle (1941) as Tony (uncredited)
 Buy Me That Town (1941) as Malcolm
 Great Guns (1941) as Gen. Burns
 Public Enemies (1941) as Tregar
 They Died with Their Boots On (1941) as Colonel of 1st Michigan (uncredited)
 Pacific Blackout (1941) as Commanding Officer
 Sealed Lips (1942) as Dr. Charles Evans
 Ride 'Em Cowboy (1942) as Rodeo Announcer #1 (uncredited)
 We Were Dancing (1942) as Mr. Bryce-Carew
 Joe Smith, American (1942) as Mr. Edgerton
 Butch Minds the Baby (1942) as J. Wadsworth Carrington
 To the Shores of Tripoli (1942) as Maj. Wilson
 Ship Ahoy (1942) as Capt. C.V. O'Brien (uncredited)
 Fingers at the Window (1942) as Dr. Chandley
 Pacific Rendezvous (1942) as John Carter
 Tarzan's New York Adventure (1942) as Judge Abbotson
 Lady in a Jam (1942) as Carter
 Wings for the Eagle (1942) as Committee Speaker (uncredited)
 Blondie for Victory (1942) as Colonel (uncredited)
 King of the Mounties (1942, Serial) as Marshal Carleton
 Springtime in the Rockies (1942) as Man in Dark with Lighter (uncredited)
 Hitler – Dead or Alive (1942) as Samuel Thornton
 Strictly in the Groove (1942) as R.C. Saunders
 Behind the Eight Ball (1942) as Harry B. Kemp
 Tennessee Johnson (1942) as Lincoln's Emissary
 Harrigan's Kid (1943) as Col. Lowry
 Air Raid Wardens (1943) as Maj. Scanlon
 King of the Cowboys (1943) as Texas Governor Shuville
 Follow the Band (1943) as Jeremiah K. Barton
 Three Hearts for Julia (1943) as Army Colonel (uncredited)
 Someone to Remember (1943) as Mr. Stanton
 Northern Pursuit (1943) as Chief Inspector (uncredited)
 His Butler's Sister (1943) as Sanderson
 There's Something About a Soldier (1943) as Mr. Edwards (uncredited)
 What a Woman! (1943) as Sutton (uncredited)
 The Woman of the Town (1943) as Publisher
 Captain America (1944, Serial) as Randolph
 Hat Check Honey (1944) as J.J. Worthington
 Bathing Beauty (1944) as Mr. Allenwood (uncredited)
 Louisiana Hayride (1944) as H.C. Forbes
 Janie (1944) as Col. Lucas – Commander Camp Wingate
 The Port of 40 Thieves (1944) as Charles Farrington
 The Captain from Köpenick (1945) as Police Commissioner
 She Gets Her Man (1945) as Mayor
 A Guy, a Gal and a Pal (1945) as General (uncredited)
 The Master Key (1945, Serial) as Police Chief Michael J. O'Brien
 The Valley of Decision (1945) as Mr. Laurence Gaylord
 Flame of Barbary Coast (1945) as Cyrus Danver
 First Yank Into Tokyo (1945) as Col. Thompson (uncredited)
 Apology for Murder (1945) as Harvey Kirkland
 That Night with You (1945) as Henry Brock (uncredited)
 A Game of Death (1945) as Mr. Whitney
 She Wouldn't Say Yes (1945) as Mr. Lindsay – Patient (uncredited)
 Getting Gertie's Garter (1945) as Board Member (uncredited)
 Scarlet Street (1945) as J.J. Hogarth
 A Close Call for Boston Blackie (1946) as Harcourt (uncredited)
 Gay Blades (1946) as Buxton
 The Bandit of Sherwood Forest (1946) as Robin Hood – Earl of Huntington
 Swing Parade of 1946 (1946) as Daniel Warren Sr.
 The Hoodlum Saint (1946) as Marty Martindale (uncredited)
 Dark Alibi (1946) as Warden Cameron
 The Unknown (1946) as Col. Wetherford (uncredited)
 G.I. War Brides (1946) as Insp. Ramsaye
 Earl Carroll Sketchbook (1946) as John Hawks (uncredited)
 The Bachelor's Daughters (1946) as John Llewelyn Dillon
 Plainsman and the Lady (1946) as Sen. Gwin
 Till the Clouds Roll By (1946) as Producer (uncredited)
 The Show-Off (1946) as Mr. Thorbison (uncredited)
 The Pilgrim Lady (1947) as Thackery Gibbs
 The Beginning or the End (1947) as General (uncredited)
 The Sea of Grass (1947) as Maj. Dell Harney
 Buck Privates Come Home (1947) as Mr. Appleby
 Fun on a Weekend (1947) as John Biddle
 Web of Danger (1947) as Mr. Gallagher
 Dark Delusion (1947) as Mr. Logan – Patient (uncredited)
 Smoky River Serenade (1947) as J. Bricket Armstrong
 Variety Girl (1947) as Man at Steambath (uncredited)
 Exposed (1947) as Col. William K. Bentry
 Louisiana (1947) as Fred Astor
 The Fabulous Texan (1947) as Gen. Sheridan (uncredited)
 The Judge Steps Out (1948) as Superior Court Judge (uncredited)
 The Mating of Millie (1948) as Kirkland (uncredited)
 The Black Arrow (1948) as Sir Harry Shelton
 The Noose Hangs High (1948) as Johnny – Copper Club Manager (uncredited)
 The Hunted (1948) as Dan Meredith – Chief of Detectives
 Silver River (1948) as Edwards (uncredited)
 Assigned to Danger (1948) as Thomas A. Rivers (uncredited)
 The Gallant Legion (1948) as Satate Senator Beale
 Race Street (1948) as Easy Mason
 Shanghai Chest (1948) as Dist. Atty. Frank Bronson
 The Velvet Touch (1948) as Judge Brack / Actor in 'Hedda Gabler': Judge Brack
 The Return of October (1948) as Taylor (uncredited)
 The Plunderers (1948) as Cavalry Colonel
 My Dear Secretary (1948) as Dick Fulton – Publisher (uncredited)
 Jiggs and Maggie in Court (1948) as Supreme Court Judge
 One Sunday Afternoon (1948) as Tredway – Barnstead's Attorney (uncredited)
 South of St. Louis (1949) as Col. Kirby (uncredited)
 I Cheated the Law (1949) as District Attorney Randolph
 Manhattan Angel (1949) as J.C. Rayland
 The Fountainhead (1949) as Banner Board Member (uncredited)
 Barbary Pirate (1949) as Commodore Preble
 Samson and Delilah (1949) as Lord of Ashkelon
 Malaya (1949) as Businessman with Cigar (uncredited)
 The Flying Saucer (1950) as Intelligence Chief Hank Thorn
 Blue Grass of Kentucky (1950) as James B. Armistead
 Unmasked (1950) as George Richards – District Attorney
 Square Dance Katy (1950) as Commissioner
 The Big Hangover (1950) as Steve Hughes
 Duchess of Idaho (1950) as Contest Judge (uncredited)
 The Petty Girl (1950) as Tycoon (uncredited)
 Again Pioneers (1950) as Pete Galloway
 The Du Pont Story (1950) as Businessman (uncredited)
 Bowery Battalion (1951) as Col. Melvin Hatfield
 Belle Le Grand (1951) as Exchange Chairman (uncredited)
 Fourteen Hours (1951) as Regan, Hotel Manager (uncredited)
 Kentucky Jubilee (1951) as T.J. Hoarsely
 All That I Have (1951) as Jess Northrup
 As You Were (1951) as Col. Lockwood
 Crazy Over Horses (1951) as Randall
 Overland Telegraph (1951) as Col. Marvin
 Rodeo (1952) as Allen H. Grandstead (uncredited)
 Old Oklahoma Plains (1952) as Colonel Charles Bigelow
 Mr. Walkie Talkie (1952) as Col. Lockwood
 The Maverick (1952) as Col. Hook
 Man of Conflict (1953) as Mr. Murdock
 You Can't Run Away from It (1956) as Ship Captain (uncredited)
 7th Cavalry (1956) as Col. Kellogg (final film)
 Once Upon a Honeymoon (1956, Short) as Angel Chief

Selected television

References

External links

1895 births
1957 deaths
American male film actors
Male actors from Baltimore
20th-century American male actors
American male stage actors
United States Army personnel of World War I
National Guard (United States) officers